Traditional Latvian music is often set to traditional poetry called dainas, featuring pre-Christian themes and legends, drone vocal styles and Baltic psaltery.

Dainas

Traditional Latvian folklore, especially the dance of the folk songs, date back well over a thousand years. More than 1.2 million texts and 30,000 melodies of folk songs have been identified.

Dainas are very short, usually only one or two stanzas, unrhymed and in a four-footed trochaic metre. Lyrically, dainas concern themselves with native mythology but, in contrast to most similar forms, do not have any legendary heroes. Stories often revolve around pre-Christian deities like the sun goddess Saule, the moon god Mēness and, most notably, the life of people, especially its three most important events - birth, wedding and death (including burial).  The first collection of dainas was published between 1894 and 1915 as Latvju Dainas by Krišjānis Barons.

Latvju tautas mūzikas materiāli, translated in English as the Materials of Latvian Folk Music is the anthology and commentary of Latvian folk. It analysed 5999 items of Latvian ethnography published in 6 editions from 1894 to 1926 by the Latvian musicologist and composer Andrejs Jurjāns (1856–1922).

Latvju tautas mūzikas materiāli Sestā grāmata (the sixth book) was published posthumously in Riga, 1926. On page 1 latvju komponistu biedrības izdevums is inscribed, translated as the Latvian Society of Composers edition.

Instrumentation

Accompaniment to the village songs is played on various traditional instruments, the most important of which is the kokles, a type of box zither related to the Lithuanian kanklės and other Baltic psalteries. In the 1970s, artists like Jānis Poriķis and Valdis Muktupāvels led a revival in kokles music, which had only survived in the Courland and Lettgallia regions. The Latvian-exile community abroad, especially in the United States, has also kept kokles traditions alive. In the last hundred years, a new kind of kokles was developed, with many more strings, halftones levelers and other improvements that expand the capacities of the instrument to play not only modal music but, in another point of view, displeased more traditional musicians. This modernized version of the instrument is called "concert kokles". However, currently  is the only remaining master concert kokles maker, although recently he has taken in two apprentices.

Classical music

Choir traditions are very strong in Latvia. Alongside many professional choirs, there are tens of thousands of Latvians who are part of different amateur choirs. Once every five years the Latvian National Song and Dance Festival takes place with around 20,000 singers taking part in it.

The 2014 World Choir Games took place in Riga.

This year (2019) Latvia hosts the inaugural Riga Jurmala Music Festival, a new festival in which world-famous orchestras and conductors perform across four weekends during the summer. The festival takes place at the Latvian National Opera, the Great Guild, and the Great and Small Halls of the Dzintari Concert Hall. This year features the Bavarian Radio Symphony Orchestra, the Israel Philharmonic Orchestra, the London Symphony Orchestra and the Russian National Orchestra.

Internationally famous Latvian musicians include conductors Arvīds Jansons and his son Mariss Jansons, violinist Gidon Kremer, cellist Mischa Maisky, and soprano Kristīne Opolais.

Popular music
During the Soviet era, rock music became extremely popular, because it, as well as folk songs, offered a chance to rebel against the local authorities. Imants Kalniņš was the most important composer of the time, and his songs were extremely popular. He also wrote music for the movie "Four White Shirts", which spoke about the need for freedom and was therefore banned. One of the most important social gatherings of the time was the annual Imantdiena ('The Day of Imants (Kalniņš)'), forbidden on grounds of interfering with hay-gathering. The tradition continued informally at the composer's house.

The songs of Imants Kalniņš were best known as performed by the group  which only played songs by this composer. Most of the members of the group moved on to form another group, Pērkons ('Thunder') later. Pērkons was a symbol of rebellion. Many of those were strongly disapproved by the Soviet authorities, as they implied the ridiculousness of the system. The most famous concert by Pērkons resulted in the destruction of a train compartment by the young people who had attended the concert. This, as well as other events, is portrayed in the movie "Is It Easy to Be Young?" by Juris Podnieks. Acts such as Pērkons certainly played an important role in the lives of the youth of the time and were a serious challenge to the Soviet system.

Nowadays, the pop music sphere is dominated by pop music (e.g., Prāta vētra) and alternative rock.

List of composers and bands in Latvia

See also
Latvian musical bows

References

External links
  Audio clips: Traditional music of Latvia. Musée d'ethnographie de Genève. Accessed November 25, 2010.
 Cronshaw, Andrew. "Singing Revolutions". 2000.  In Broughton, Simon and Ellingham, Mark with McConnachie, James and Duane, Orla (Ed.), World Music, Vol. 1: Africa, Europe and the Middle East, pp 16–24. Rough Guides Ltd, Penguin Books.